Argyresthia trifasciata, the juniper ermine moth,  is a moth of the family Yponomeutidae. It is found in great parts of Europe, but originates from the Alps.

The wingspan is 7–10 mm. The moth flies from May to September. .

The larvae feed on Juniperus communis, Thuja, Chamaecyparis and Leylandcipres.

References

Notes
The flight season refers to Belgium and The Netherlands. This may vary in other parts of the range.

External links
lepiforum.de
 European Butterflies and Moths by Christopher Jonko
 waarneming.nl 
 Lepidoptera of Belgium
 Argyresthia trifasciata at UK Moths

Moths described in 1871
Argyresthia
Moths of Europe